Lønning is a Norwegian surname. As of 2013, there are 574 people in Norway with this surname. The word lønning is Norwegian for pay day.

Notable people
Notable people with this surname include:
 Eivind Lønning (born 1983), Norwegian musician
 Inge Lønning (1938–2013), Norwegian theologian
 Per Lønning (1928–2016), Norwegian bishop

References

Surnames of Norwegian origin